The 2015–16 Presbyterian Blue Hose men's basketball team represented Presbyterian College during the 2015–16 NCAA Division I men's basketball season. The Blue Hose, led by 27th year head coach Gregg Nibert, played their home games at the Templeton Physical Education Center and were members of the Big South Conference. They finished the season 11–20, 5–13 in Big South play to finish a four way tie for eighth place. They defeated Radford in the first round of the Big South tournament to advance to the quarterfinals where they lost to Winthrop.

Roster

Schedule

|-
!colspan=9 style="background:#0060AA; color:white;"| Exhibition

|-
!colspan=9 style="background:#0060AA; color:white;"| Regular season

|-
!colspan=9 style="background:#0060AA; color:white;"| Big South tournament

References

Presbyterian Blue Hose men's basketball seasons
Presbyterian